A number of ships have carried the name Hakuni, including:

, a Finnish cargo ship in service 1959–66
, a Hauki-class transport ship

Ship names